The Banner of Krivoi Rog is an East German film, directed by Kurt Maetzig. It was released in 1967.

Plot
Communist miner Otto Brosowski writes to the Krivoi Rog's miners telling them of the harsh conditions in which he and his friends work, as the capitalist owners of the copper mine demand harder work. He receives a Red Banner from them. As the Nazis seize power, Otto and his family hide the flag from the authorities, taking great personal risks. In 1945, as the Second World War nears its end, the town is occupied by the Americans, who also wish to steal the Banner. At July 1945, as the Americans retreat and allow the Red Army to take over the area, the Brosowski family takes the flag and heads to meet the Soviets.

Cast
 Erwin Geschonneck: Otto Brosowski Senior
 Marga Legal: Minna Brosowski
 Helmut Schellhardt: Otto Brosowski Junior
 Eva-Maria Hagen: Elfriede
 Manfred Krug: Jule Hammer
 Angela Brunner: Frau Bienert
 Rudolf Ulrich: Bienert
 Horst Kube: Bartel
 Horst Giese: Gestapo spy
 Walter Kaufmann: Lieutenant Stone
 Perry Friedman: American officer
 Fred Delmare: Communist driver

Production

The script of The Banner of Krivoi Rog was adapted from Otto Gotsche's popular novel by the same name, which was entered into the East German schools' curriculum. Gotsche's book was based on real events which took place in Gerbstedt before and during the Second World War: a man named Otto Brosowski had hidden a Red Banner he received from the miners in Krivoi Rog. The Banner itself was kept as a symbol of Soviet-German friendship. Maetzig's film was commissioned for the 50th anniversary of the October Revolution.

Reception
The film was viewed by 2,772,000 people in the two months from its release until the end of 1967, with 750,000 of them in the first two weeks; that figure also included those who saw it in mandatory screenings in collective farms and schools. It became the second most popular East German film of the year, after Chingachgook, the Great Snake.

Maetzig, writer Hans-Albert Pederzani, actors Erwin Geschonneck and Marga Legal and cinematographer Erich Gusko were all awarded the National Prize, 1st degree, on 3 October 1968. The film also won the Cinema Award of the magazine Junge Welt.

Heiko R. Blum wrote that "the pathetic style, the hollow words... cannot destroy the picturesque quality of this impressive film, which is modeled after the classical Soviet epics." The German Film Lexicon defined The Banner of Kriwoy Rog as "an impressive, historically insightful picture that conveys its propaganda in a humane manner."

References

External links
 
 The Banner of Krivoi Rog original poster on ostfilm.de.
 The Banner of Krivoi Rog on filmportal.de.

1967 films
History of Kryvyi Rih
East German films
1960s German-language films
Films directed by Kurt Maetzig